Klaus-Peter Justus (born 1 July 1951 in Königsee, Thuringia) is a retired East German middle distance runner who specialized in the 1500 metres.

He won the gold medals at the 1970 European Junior Championships and the 1974 European Championships, and the bronze medal at the 1973 European Indoor Championships. He competed at the 1972 Summer Olympics without reaching the final.

He competed for the club SC Motor Jena during his active career. His son Steffen Justus is also a successful triathlete and runner.

References

1951 births
Living people
People from Königsee
East German male middle-distance runners
Athletes (track and field) at the 1972 Summer Olympics
Olympic athletes of East Germany
European Athletics Championships medalists
Sportspeople from Thuringia